Presidential elections were held in Austria on 25 April 1971. The result was a victory for incumbent President Franz Jonas of the Socialist Party, who received 53% of the vote. Voter turnout was 95%.

Results

References

Presidential elections in Austria
President
Austria
Austria